Amela Terzić (Serbian Cyrillic: Амела Терзић, born 2 January 1993) is a Serbian middle-distance runner. She won two gold medals at 2011 European Athletics Junior Championships in Tallinn and was the junior champion at the 2012 European Cross Country Championships. She has also been a medallist in the 1500 metres at the World Junior and World Youth Championships and a gold medalist at the 2013 European U23 Championship.

Terzić lives in Barakovac, Novi Pazar and is coached by Rifat Zilkić. She was awarded a golden badge for the best young athlete of Serbia in 2011 and 2012.

Running career
Her first international appearances came in 2008 at the age of fifteen. That year she was second in the 800 m and third in the 1500 m at the Balkan Junior Athletics Championships. She established herself as a youth and junior athlete the following year: she was the Balkan junior champion in cross country and both middle-distance events, took bronze in the 1500 m at the 2009 World Youth Championships in Athletics, and was the champion in the 3000 metres at the European Youth Olympic Festival (where she also took 1500 m bronze). Further to this, she was a finalist in the 1500 m and 3000 m at the 2009 European Athletics Junior Championships and came twelfth in the junior section of the 2009 European Cross Country Championships.

Terzić began 2010 with a win at the Belikros cross country race in Serbia. On the track she was eighth in the 1500 m at the 2010 World Junior Championships in Athletics and won the 3000 m at the European junior clubs championship. He first major junior medal came in the form of a silver medal at the 2010 European Cross Country Championships, finishing three seconds behind winner Charlotte Purdue. Another win at the Belikros opened 2011 In her world debut on grass she came 32nd at the junior race of the 2011 IAAF World Cross Country Championships, which was among the best placings by a European. A 1500/3000 m double at the 2011 European Athletics Junior Championships confirmed her place among the top junior runners in the region. She won a third European medal of the season at the 2011 European Cross Country Championships, taking the bronze medal.

Terzić made her first impact in senior level athletics in the 2012 season. She won the silver medal at the 2012 World Junior Championships in Athletics with a Serbian national record time of 4:07.59 minutes for the 15000 m. A week later she took both the 1500 m and 3000 m titles at the Balkan Athletics Championships. She placed fourth in the 1500 at the Rieti Meeting and ran another national record in the non-standard 1000 m distance at the Athletics Bridge meet. In her final appearance in the junior category, she won the gold medal at the 2012 European Cross Country Championships. She celebrated the New Year by winning at the Silvesterlauf Peuerbach 5K road race, beating top marathon runner Irina Mikitenko.

In 2013 season she won a gold medal at the European U23 Championship in 1500m with a national record of 4:05.69 and debuted at the senior World Championship without reaching finals. In the same season she won her first cross-county medal as U23 athlete, silver at home at the European Cross Country Championships in Serbia.

In 2014, she competed for the first time in senior European Outdoor Championship and finished 12th in final.

Personal bests

International competitions

References

External links
 
 
 
 
  (archive)

1993 births
Living people
Bosniaks of Serbia
People from Priboj
Serbian female middle-distance runners
World Athletics Championships athletes for Serbia
Athletes (track and field) at the 2016 Summer Olympics
Olympic athletes of Serbia
Universiade medalists in athletics (track and field)
Universiade gold medalists for Serbia
Athletes (track and field) at the 2018 Mediterranean Games
Medalists at the 2017 Summer Universiade
Mediterranean Games competitors for Serbia
21st-century Serbian women